In geometry, the sphenocorona is one of the Johnson solids. It is one of the elementary Johnson solids that do not arise from "cut and paste" manipulations of the Platonic and Archimedean solids.

Johnson uses the prefix spheno- to refer to a wedge-like complex formed by two adjacent lunes, a lune being a square with equilateral triangles attached on opposite sides. Likewise, the suffix -corona refers to a crownlike complex of 8 equilateral triangles. Joining both complexes together results in the sphenocorona.

Cartesian coordinates
Let k ≈ 0.85273 be the smallest positive root of the quartic polynomial

 

Then, Cartesian coordinates of a sphenocorona with edge length 2 are given by the union of the orbits of the points

under the action of the group generated by reflections about the xz-plane and the yz-plane.

One may then calculate the surface area of a sphenocorona of edge length a as

and its volume as

Variations 
The sphenocorona is also the vertex figure of the isogonal n-gonal double antiprismoid where n is an odd number greater than one, including the grand antiprism with pairs of trapezoid rather than square faces.

See also
 Augmented sphenocorona

References

External links
 

Johnson solids